The Indosiar Television Tower is a  guyed mast used for FM- and TV-broadcasting in West Jakarta, Indonesia, completed in 2006. It is currently the tallest structure in Indonesia. This special design, which gives the tower a unique shape, was chosen because of the lack of space available on the site. Broadcasting is run by the local television network, SCTV and Indosiar, both of which is owned by Surya Citra Media, a part of Elang Mahkota Teknologi.

References

External links
 News from Caturmitra.co.id

Indosiar
Buildings and structures completed in 2006
2006 establishments in Indonesia
Towers in Indonesia
Buildings and structures in Jakarta
Radio masts and towers